The  was an infantry division of the Imperial Japanese Army. It was formed 16 January 1945 in Mudanjiang as a triangular division. It was a part of the 8 simultaneously created divisions batch comprising 121st, 122nd, 123rd, 124th, 125th, 126th, 127th and 128th divisions. The nucleus for the formation were the 1st, 2nd, and parts of 11th border guards group.

Action
Initially, the 128th division was assigned to the 3rd army. The 128th division headquarters were established in March 1945 at Luozigou (Lotzukou), replacing the 120th division transferred to the south of Korea. The division combat efficiency was estimated to be 20%.

Immediately after the start of the Soviet invasion of Manchuria 9 August 1945 the 128th division was subordinated directly to 1st area army as planned. At the same time, 132nd Independent Mixed Brigade was attached to the division.

Initial Soviet attack was parred by 132nd Independent Mixed Brigade at Dongning, Heilongjiang, but 11 August 1945 the Red Army column outflanked Dongning defenders from the south and penetrated deeply into Japanese-held territory. In the evening 12 August 1945, the 128th division fell back to the second line of defenses around Huadian, Jilin where it stayed until surrender of Japan news reached units 16 August 1945.

Although the estimated number of soldiers of 128th division killed in action during the Soviet invasion of Manchuria was only 1095 men, the 128th division was severely disorganized, retaining only half of combat efficiency after the brief conflict.

Majority of the troops of the division were taken prisoner by the Red Army and were taken to Siberian labour camps in September - October 1945.

See also
 List of Japanese Infantry Divisions
 Independent Mixed Brigades (Imperial Japanese Army)

Notes and references
This article incorporates material from Japanese Wikipedia page 第128師団 (日本軍), accessed 4 July 2016
 Madej, W. Victor, Japanese Armed Forces Order of Battle, 1937–1945 [2 vols], Allentown, PA: 1981.

Japanese World War II divisions
Infantry divisions of Japan
Military units and formations established in 1945
Military units and formations disestablished in 1945
1945 establishments in Japan
1945 disestablishments in Japan